Second String is a direct-to-TV film from 2002 about the Buffalo Bills football team who find its first string (led by real-life Bills quarterback Doug Flutie, who had left the team by the time the film was released) out for a month after a food poisoning incident, leading the team's head coach, "Chuck Dichter" (portrayed by Jon Voight), to hire an insurance salesman and former college quarterback named Dan Heller (played by Gil Bellows) as the team's backup quarterback. Teri Polo also appeared as Heller's wife; Flutie, Mike Ditka, Chris Berman, Van Miller, Bills cornerback Donovan Greer and Ken "Pinto Ron" Johnson appear as themselves. The film originally aired on TNT.

References

External links

2002 television films
2002 films
American football films
Buffalo Bills
American films based on actual events
TNT Network original films
Films directed by Robert Lieberman
2000s American films